Kožlany is a town in Plzeň-North District in the Plzeň Region of the Czech Republic. It has about 1,500 inhabitants.

Administrative parts
Villages of Buček, Dřevec, Hedčany and Hodyně are administrative parts of Kožlany.

Geography
It lies in the Plasy Uplands.

Notable people
Edvard Beneš (1884–1948), the second president of Czechoslovakia

References

External links

 

Cities and towns in the Czech Republic